Prank is a 2016 Canadian comedy film directed by Vincent Biron. It was screened in the Discovery section at the 2016 Toronto International Film Festival.

Cast
 Étienne Galloy as Stefie
 Alexandre Lavigne as Martin
 Constance Massicotte as Lea
 Simon Pigeon as Jean-Se

Awards
The film was shortlisted for the Prix collégial du cinéma québécois in 2017.

References

External links
 

2016 films
2016 comedy films
Canadian comedy films
Films directed by Vincent Biron
2016 directorial debut films
French-language Canadian films
2010s Canadian films
2010s French-language films